() is a Sundanese dance from Indonesia which combines the dance movements of  and  as the basic of its motions. In the dance, hips, arms, shoulders, head, and hands move dynamically. Footsteps also incorporated into the dance. The dancers wear typical Sundanese . The  is designed fit the shape of the body and the clothes are brightly colored. Additional accessories such as scarves and fan are incorporated into the dance. Often the dancers are also moving in formation of interest.  dance was created  2000. In each show, dance is always accompanied by a typical drum from the land of Pasundan. In addition, the Balinese  music adds to the wealth of music that accompanies the dance. The dance usually performed by four to eight dancers.

See also

 Jaipongan
 Sundanese culture

References 

Dances of Indonesia
Sundanese culture
Culture of West Java